Robert L. Bradshaw Airport , formerly known as Golden Rock Airport, is an international airport located just northeast of Basseterre, on the island of Saint Kitts, serving the nation of Saint Kitts and Nevis.  It was named after the first Premier of St. Kitts-Nevis-Anguilla (as it then was), Robert Llewellyn Bradshaw. In 2008, the airport handled 399,706 passengers.

Overview
A major renovation was completed in December 2006. The US$17 million project financed by loans from the St Kitts-Nevis-Anguilla National Bank and Taiwan, includes expansion of the parking apron to accommodate six-wide-bodied aircraft at the same time, complete resurfacing of the  runway and construction of a new taxi-way.  Construction started late 2004. Up to 6 wide bodied jets can now be accommodated on the tarmac.  The airport can accommodate commercial jumbo jets and handles scheduled non-stop jet flights to Canada and the United States, as well as numerous regional commuter flights from within the Caribbean area.

The airport also provides facilities for cargo and private jets.  The largest aircraft ever to land here was a Boeing 747-400.  A chartered Sri Lankan Airlines Airbus A340-300 made aviation history when they operated a charter flight to St Kitts in 2011, a nearly 10,000-mile journey from Colombo-BIA, Sri Lanka.

Airlines and destinations

Passenger

Cargo

Other facilities
The airport houses the St. Kitts Outstation of the Eastern Caribbean Civil Aviation Authority.

Accidents and incidents
 On 26 September 2009, British Airways Flight 2156 to V. C. Bird International Airport, Antigua, operated by Boeing 777-236 G-VIIR entered the runway through the wrong taxiway, prior to takeoff. This resulted in the aircraft having 695m less available for takeoff, compared to the correct taxiway entry. The takeoff was however completed normally with no injuries or other damages. The AAIB concluded in its report that the following factors contributed to the incident: "The airport authority had not installed any taxiway or holding point signs on the airfield. The crew did not brief the taxi routing. The crew misidentified Taxiway Bravo for Taxiway Alpha and departed from Intersection Bravo. The trainee ATCO did not inform the flight crew that they were at Intersection Bravo."

References

External links

Bradshaw International Airport
Bradshaw International Airport
Bradshaw International Airport